František Řezáč can refer to:

 František Řezáč (cyclist) (born 1943), Czech Olympic cyclist
 František Řezáč (wrestler) (born 1898), Czech Olympic wrestler